Stojić is a surname. Notable people with the surname include:

 Bruno Stojić, Bosnian Croat politician
 Dijana Stojić, Croatian former tennis player
 Mario Stojić, Croatian basketball player
 Nemanja Stojić, Serbian football player
 Nikola Stojić, Serbian rower
 Ranko Stojić, Serbian football player and manager

See also
 Stojići (disambiguation)

Croatian surnames
Serbian surnames